Kyllian Villeminot (born 20 May 1998) is a French handball player for Montpellier Handball.

Achievements 
 EHF Champions League
 Winner: 2018

Individual awards
 MVP at the 2016 Youth European Championship
MVP at the 2017 Youth World Championship
All-Star Team as best Centre back at the 2018 Junior European Championship
All-Star Team as best Centre back at the 2019 Junior World Championship

References

External links
 Kyllian Villeminot at European Handball Federation
 Kyllian Villeminot at Ligue nationale de handball

French male handball players
1998 births
Living people
Montpellier Handball players